Roberto Blanco (19031965) was an Argentine stage and film actor. He appeared in more than thirty films during his career many of them during the Golden Age of Argentine Cinema.

Selected filmography
 Outside the Law (1937)
 Isabelita (1940)
 I Want to Be a Chorus Girl (1941)
 The Tango Returns to Paris (1948)
 Valentina (1950)

References

Bibliography 
 Finkielman, Jorge. The Film Industry in Argentina: An Illustrated Cultural History. McFarland, 24 Dec 2003.

External links 
 

1903 births
1965 deaths
Argentine male film actors
Argentine male stage actors
20th-century Argentine male actors